"Legacy" is the 80th episode of the syndicated American science fiction television series Star Trek: The Next Generation, the sixth episode of the fourth season. It marked the point at which the series surpassed the number of episodes in the original series.

Set in the 24th century, the series follows the adventures of the Starfleet crew of the Federation starship Enterprise-D. In this episode, the Enterprise crew is caught in the midst of a civil war on Turkana IV, former crew member Tasha Yar's homeworld. While negotiating with one of the factions, they discover that the faction's representative is Tasha's younger sister, Ishara Yar.

Plot
The Enterprise, under the command of Captain Jean-Luc Picard (Patrick Stewart), responds to a distress call from the Federation freighter Arcos, which has suffered engine failure and taken emergency orbit around the planet Turkana IV, the birthplace of the Enterprises late chief of security, Tasha Yar. The Enterprise arrives just as the Arcos explodes, and finds a trail left behind by the freighter's escape pod leading to the colony. Turkana IV's government collapsed 15 years before; and the last Federation ship to visit, six years earlier, was warned by the colony's warring factions that trespassers to the planet would be executed. Because the freighter crew's lives are in danger, Picard decides to attempt a rescue.

Commander Riker (Jonathan Frakes) leads an away team to the surface, where they find the colonists initially unperturbed by their presence, but soon end up in a standoff with one of the colony's two remaining warring factions, the Coalition. Their leader, Hayne (Don Mirault), reveals that the other faction, the Alliance, holds the Arcos survivors hostage, and offers the Enterprise the Coalition's support in exchange for Federation weapons, a proposal that Riker rejects. Hayne, however, after learning of Tasha Yar's service aboard the Enterprise, instead offers as a liaison Ishara Yar (Beth Toussaint), saying she is Tasha's sister. Picard accepts Ishara aboard; although the crew is initially skeptical, DNA tests support her claim, and she gradually gains their trust. Commander Data (Brent Spiner), who was especially close to Tasha, becomes friends with Ishara, who seems ready to leave behind her life in the colony.

To find the hostages, Chief Engineer Geordi La Forge (LeVar Burton) suggests using the crashed escape pod's instruments; Ishara recommends that she beam separately to a nearby location as a distraction, because her implanted proximity device will set off the Alliance's alarms. The crew executes the plan, but Ishara is wounded in the attempt. Riker rescues her, and is impressed by her bravery. Later, Ishara privately tells Hayne "It's working."

When the Enterprise receives a message from the Alliance announcing that they are preparing to kill the Arcos crew, Picard's crew decides to execute Ishara's proposed rescue plan: Dr. Crusher (Gates McFadden) removes Ishara's proximity device, which she gives to Data as a memento. Riker leads an away team to the planet, where they rescue the hostages, but Ishara disappears in the confusion. Data finds her trying to disable the Alliance security grid; Ishara reveals that a large Coalition force is just outside the Alliance perimeter waiting to attack. Data concludes that all her interaction with the crew was a ploy. Riker arrives to distract Ishara just as she fires at Data, who dodges and then stuns her and reverses her attempted sabotage. Riker notes that her phaser was set to kill.

With the away team and Ishara back aboard the Enterprise, Hayne demands that Picard return Ishara and challenges his jurisdiction. While Riker argues that they have cause to hold her for firing on two Starfleet officers, Picard decides to allow her to leave. As Data escorts her to the transporter room, Ishara claims he was the closest thing she had to a friend. Data considers his relationships with both Ishara and Tasha, as the Enterprise departs.

Releases 
"Legacy" was released in the United States on September 3, 2002, as part of the Star Trek: The Next Generation season four DVD box set.

References

 Star Trek The Next Generation DVD set, volume 4, disc 2, selection 2

External links

 
 "Legacy" by Keith R. A. DeCandido

Star Trek: The Next Generation (season 4) episodes
1990 American television episodes
Television episode directed by Robert Scheerer